The Arrow Cross Party (abbreviated NYKP) was a far-right Hungarian ultranationalist party led by Ferenc Szálasi, which formed a government in Hungary they named the Government of National Unity. They were in power from 15 October 1944 to 28 March 1945. During its short rule, ten to fifteen thousand civilians were murdered outright, including many Jews and Romani, and 80,000 people were deported from Hungary to concentration camps in Austria. After the war, Szálasi and other Arrow Cross leaders were tried as war criminals by Hungarian courts.

Formation

The party was founded by Ferenc Szálasi in 1935 as the Party of National Will. It had its origins in the political philosophy of pro-German extremists such as Gyula Gömbös, who coined the term "national socialism" in the 1920s. The party was outlawed in 1937 but was reconstituted in 1939 as the Arrow Cross Party, and was modelled fairly explicitly on the Nazi Party of Germany, although Szálasi often harshly criticised the Nazi regime of Germany. The party's iconography was clearly inspired by that of the Nazis.

The Nyilaskereszt ("arrow cross") emblem was considered to be a symbol of the Magyar tribes who, from the late 9th century, conquered and settled in what became Hungary. In emulating the central role of the swastika in Nazi ideology, the arrow cross also alluded to the purported racial purity of the Magyars, in the same way that the swastika was intended to allude to the purported racial purity of the Germans. The arrow cross symbol had other ideological implications, including a desire to nullify the Treaty of Trianon, and expand the Hungarian state in all cardinal directions, out to the  borders of the former Kingdom of Hungary.

Ideology

The party's ideology was similar to those of Nazism and Fascism and it combined aspects of those ideologies with Hungarian Turanism, forming an ideology which Ferenc Szálasi called "Hungarism". It combined nationalism, the promotion of agriculture, anti-capitalism, anti-communism and a special type of anti-Semitism, called a-Semitism. In a series of four books on Hungarism, Szálasi distinguished a-Semitism, which called for a society which should be completely absent of Jews, from anti-Semitism, which, he argued, would nominally allow Jews to exist in a particular society with limited rights. He argued that a-Semitism was not opposed to the existence of Jews per se, instead, it regarded their existence as being incompatible with European society. Szálasi extended this argument to Arabs, and he also extended it to the whole Semitic Race. The party and its leader originally opposed German geopolitical ambitions, so Hitler was slow to accept Szálasi's connationalism, the support of nationalist movements within their historical territories and spheres of influence on the grounds of historical evidence of cultural dominance. This concept was poorly understood by the Germans because it combined nationalism and internationalism, the co-operation of nationalist movements. Consequently, the party judged Jews in racial as well as religious terms, it believed that Jews were incapable of being integrated into any society which was outside the place and culture of their historical origins. Although the Arrow Cross Party was certainly far more racist than the Horthy regime was, it differed from the German Nazi Party. It was also more economically radical than other fascist movements were, it advocated some workers' rights and land reforms.

Rise to power

The roots of Arrow Cross influence can be traced to the antisemitism that followed the Communist putsch, the creation of the Hungarian Soviet Republic, and Red Terror during the spring and summer of 1919. Some Communist leaders were from Jewish families such as like Tibor Szamuely. Béla Kun, the Republic's leader and instigator of the Terror, had a secular Jewish father and a mother who, despite converting to the Reformed Church of Hungary, was still seen as being a Jew. The Hungarian Soviet Republic's policies were credited by some anti-communists as being part of a "Judeo-Bolshevist conspiracy."

After the Soviet Republic was overthrown in August 1919, conservative authoritarians under the leadership of Admiral Miklós Horthy seized control. Many Hungarian military officers took part in the counter-reprisals known as the White Terror – parts of which were directed at Jews. Although the White Guard was officially suppressed, many of its most prevalent members went underground and formed the core membership of a spreading nationalist antisemitic movement.

During the 1930s, the Arrow Cross began to dominate Budapest's working class neighborhoods, defeating the Social Democrats. The Social Democrats did not contest elections effectively and they were forced into a pact with the conservative Horthy regime in order to prevent their abolition. The Arrow Cross recruited from the poorest members of society, including the chronically unemployed, alcoholics, ex-convicts, prisoners, rapists, and the uneducated. These members later committed some of the most brutal crimes against Jews, intellectuals, socialists, and other civilians.

The Arrow Cross subscribed to the Nazi ideology of "master races", which, in Szálasi's view, included the Hungarians and Germans, and also supported the concept of an order based on the power of the strongest – what Szálasi called a "brutally realistic étatism". But its espousal of territorial claims under the banner of a "Greater Hungary" and Hungarian values ("Hungarizmus" or "Hungarianism") clashed with Nazi ambitions, delaying Hitler's endorsement of that party by several years.

The German Foreign Office instead endorsed the pro-German Hungarian National Socialist Party, which had some supporters among ethnic Germans. Before World War II, the Arrow Cross were not proponents of the racial antisemitism of the Nazis, but utilised traditional stereotypes and prejudices to gain votes among voters both in Budapest and the countryside. Nonetheless, the constant bickering among these diverse fascist groups prevented the Arrow Cross Party from gaining more support and power.

The Arrow Cross obtained most of its support from a disparate coalition of military officers, soldiers, nationalists and agricultural workers. It was only one of several similar fascist factions in Hungary but was by far the most prominent, through effective recruiting. In the only election it participated in, in May 1939, the party won 15% of the vote and 29 seats in the Hungarian Parliament but this was only superficially impressive as most Hungarians were not permitted to vote. It did become one of the most powerful parties in Hungary but the Horthy leadership banned the Arrow Cross on the outbreak of World War II, forcing it to operate clandestinely.

In 1944, the Arrow Cross Party's fortunes abruptly reversed when Hitler lost patience with Horthy's and his moderate prime minister's, Miklós Kállay's, reluctance to fully toe the Nazi line. In March 1944, the Germans invaded and occupied Hungary, which resulted in Kállay fleeing, and a Nazi proxy, Döme Sztójay, replacing him who quickly legalised the Arrow Cross.

During the spring and summer of 1944, more than 400,000 Jews were driven into centralised ghettos and then deported from the Hungarian countryside to death camps by the Nazis, with the enthusiastic assistance of the Hungarian Interior Ministry and its gendarmerie (the csendőrség), both of which had members closely linked to the Arrow Cross. Budapest Jews were forced into Yellow Star Houses, approximately 2,000 single-building mini-ghettos identified by a yellow Star of David at the entrance. In August 1944, before deportations from Budapest began, Horthy used what remaining influence he had to stop them, and force the radical antisemites out of his government.

As the summer progressed, and with the Allied and Soviet armies closing in on central Europe, the ability of the Nazis to devote resources to Hungary's "Jewish Solution" waned, but they still carried out many massacres. Jews were often rounded up on the streets by Arrow Cross men, and their standard procedure was to take children away from their parents, then killing or beating any parent or child who protested. The Arrow Cross repeatedly organized mass murders next to the Danube, shooting people in the head, with the bodies falling into the river. To save bullets, their favorite method was to tie the waists of three people together with wire and shoot only the middle person, who would fall forward into the river drowning the other two as the weight of the copse dragged them to the bottom of the Danube. It has been estimated that during the autumn of 1944 there were no more than 4,000 members of the Arrow Cross in Budapest, yet despite this they were able to terrorize the city's population of a million. Their methods eventually became too sickening even for the German military whose commander General Karl Pfeffer-Wildenbruch ordered his troops not to take part in the killings. On the other hand, the German envoy to Hungary Edmund Veesenmayer received orders from Berlin to provide as much assistance as he could to the Arrow Cross in killing of Jews. 
Eventually Szálasi became concerned about the impression that neutral diplomats were forming of his government and ordered that the killings be undertaken with more discretion. The country's national police commissioner Pál Hódosy concurred, "The problem is not that the Jews are being murdered... the trouble is the method. The bodies must be made to disappear, not put out on the streets." This view was shared by parliamentarian Károlyl Maróthy who said "We must not allow individual cases to create comparison for them... something must be done to stop the death rattle going on in the ditches day and night... the population must not be able to see them dying"

Arrow Cross rule

In October 1944, Horthy negotiated a cease-fire with the Soviets and ordered Hungarian troops to lay down their arms. In response, Nazi Germany launched the covert Operation Panzerfaust which took Horthy into "protective custody" in Germany and forced him to abdicate. Szálasi was made "Leader of the Nation" and prime minister of a "Government of National Unity" the same day.

Soviet and Romanian forces were already well within the Hungarian borders by this time. As a result, its authority was limited to an ever-narrowing band of territory around Budapest. Nonetheless, their rule was brutal. In under three months, their death squads killed as many as 38,000 Hungarian Jews. Arrow Cross officers helped Adolf Eichmann re-start deportations from which the Jews of Budapest had thus far been spared, sending some 80,000 Jews out of the city on slave labour details and many more straight to death camps. Virtually all Jewish males of conscription age were already serving as slave labour for the Hungarian Army's Forced Labor Battalions. Most died, including many who were murdered as they were returning home after the end of the fighting.

Red Army troops reached the outskirts of the city in December 1944, and the Siege of Budapest began. Arrow Cross members and the Germans may have conspired to destroy the Budapest ghetto but any evidence remains disputed. Days before fleeing, Arrow Cross Interior Minister Gábor Vajna ordered that streets and squares named for Jews be renamed.

As control of the city's institutions weakened, the Arrow Cross trained their guns on the most helpless possible targets including patients in the city's two Jewish hospitals on Maros Street and Bethlen Square, remaining women and children, and residents in the Jewish poorhouse on Alma Road. As order collapsed, Arrow Cross members continued their attacks on Jews so that the majority of Budapest's Jews were only saved by the heroic efforts of a handful of Jewish leaders and foreign diplomats, most famously the Swedish Raoul Wallenberg, the Papal Nuncio Monsignor Angelo Rotta, Swiss Consul Carl Lutz, Spanish Consul Ángel Sanz Briz and the Italian cattle trader Giorgio Perlasca.

The Arrow Cross government effectively fell at the end of January 1945, when the Soviet Army took Pest and the Axis forces retreated across the Danube to Buda. Szálasi had escaped from Budapest on December 11, 1944, taking with him the Hungarian royal crown, while Arrow Cross members and German forces continued to fight a rear-guard action in the far west of Hungary until the end of the war in April 1945.

Post-war developments

After the war, many Arrow Cross leaders were captured and tried for war crimes and no fewer than 6,200 indictments for murder were served against Arrow Cross men in just a few months. Some Arrow Cross officials were executed, including Szálasi.

The victims were forced to remove their shoes, all of which were confiscated later, and then shot so that their bodies would fall into the river.

In 2006, a former high-ranking member, Lajos Polgár, was found in Melbourne, Australia. He died of natural causes in July of that year after the war crimes case against him was dropped.

To some extent, the ideology of the Arrow Cross has resurfaced in recent years, with the neofascist Hungarian Welfare Association being prominent in reviving Szálasi's "Hungarizmus" through its monthly magazine, Magyartudat ("Hungarian Awareness") but "Hungarism" remains a fringe element in modern Hungarian politics, and the Hungarian Welfare Association has dissolved.

Electoral results

National Assembly

See also
 András Kun
 Antisemitism in contemporary Hungary
 Fidesz
 Hungarian National Socialist Party
 The Holocaust in Hungary
 Hungary during the Second World War
 Music Box
 The Fifth Seal

References

Further reading
  Braham, R. The Politics of Genocide: The Holocaust in Hungary (New York: Columbia University Press, 2 vol.; 2nd ed. 1994).
 Cohen, Asher. "Some Socio-Political Aspects of the Arrow Cross Party in Hungary." East European Quarterly 21.3 (1987): 369+
 Deák, István.  “Hungary”  in Hans Rogger and Egon Weber, eds., The European right: A historical profile (1963) pp. 364–407. 
 Deak, Istvan. "Collaborationism in Europe, 1940–1945: the case of Hungary." Austrian History Yearbook 15 (1979): 157–164.
 Deák, István. "A fatal compromise? The debate over collaboration and resistance in Hungary." East European Politics and Societies 9.2 (1995): 209–233.
 Herczl, Moshe Y. Christianity and the Holocaust of Hungarian Jewry (1993) online
 Lackó, M. Arrow-Cross Men: National Socialists 1935–1944 (Budapest, Akadémiai Kiadó 1969).

External links

Far-right political parties in Hungary
Defunct political parties in Hungary
Antiziganism in Hungary
Antisemitism in Hungary
Fascism in Hungary
Hungarian collaborators with Nazi Germany
Hungarian Nazis
Hungarian Turanism
Nazi parties
Parties of one-party systems
Political parties established in 1935
Political parties disestablished in 1945
1935 establishments in Hungary
1945 disestablishments in Hungary
Banned far-right parties